The Lion of Africa is a 1987 American adventure film directed by Kevin Connor and written by Bruce Franklin Singer. The film stars Brian Dennehy, Brooke Adams, Yosef Shiloach, Don Warrington, Carl Andrews and Katherine Schofield. The film premiered on June 28, 1987, on HBO.

Plot

Cast 
Brian Dennehy as Sam Marsh
Brooke Adams as Grace Danet
Yosef Shiloach as Valentim
Don Warrington as Henry Piggot
Carl Andrews as Jemmy Banta
Katherine Schofield as Cecilia
Joe Chege as Wallace
Tony Msalame as African Doctor
Oliver Litondo as Sergeant 
William Tsuma as Joko
Rose Maruru as Joko's Girlfriend
Edwin Mahinda as Joko's Brother
Mwangangi Ndunda as Kandinko Shaman 
Margaret Averdling as Jemmy's Wife

References

External links
 

1987 television films
1987 films
American adventure films
1980s adventure films
HBO Films films
Films directed by Kevin Connor
1980s English-language films
1980s American films